General elections were held in Ecuador on 19 February 2017 alongside a referendum on tax havens. Voters elected a new President and National Assembly. Incumbent President Rafael Correa of the PAIS Alliance was not eligible for re-election, having served two terms. In the first round of the presidential elections, PAIS Alliance candidate Lenín Moreno received 39% of the vote. Although he was more than 10% ahead of his nearest rival, Guillermo Lasso of the Creating Opportunities party, Moreno was just short of the 40% threshold required to avoid a run-off. As a result, a second round was held on 2 April. In the second round Moreno was elected president with 51.16% of the vote.

Background
Following nearly a decade of political volatility in Ecuador that was characterized by impeachments, economic crises, and public unrest, Rafael Correa, the nation's previous president, began his ascendance to power. During his 2006 campaign Correa established the PAIS Alliance, a coalition of leftist organizations that is the same party of current president Lenin Moreno. Lenin Moreno previously served as Correa's vice president.

Throughout his campaign and during his presidency Correa mobilized populist rhetoric to gain support, framing himself in opposition to the former political elite and current economic elite: Correa used the terms “neoliberal night” (“noche neoliberal”) and “particracy” (“partidocracia”) to refer to those groups, respectively, and characterized his own movement as a “citizen's revolution” (La revolucion ciudadana). Correa's success was part of a larger wave of leftist movements in Latin American that began around the turn of century, frequently referred to as the “pink tide.” Other countries that elected left-leaning presidents in the early 2000s include Argentina (Néstor Kirchner), Venezuela (Hugo Chávez), and Brazil (Luiz Inácio Lula da Silva), among others.

One of the most significant events that took place during Correa's time in office was the ratification of a new constitution in 2008. Correa advocated for the new constitution and his supporters welcomed it, citing a focus on civil rights and social programs for the impoverished. However, the constitution was also met with much opposition, as its detractors feared that the document would give too much economic authority to the executive and initially believed its elimination of term limits would benefit Correa himself, although a provision on the amendment assured the law would not be put into action until after his presidency had ended.

Guillermo Lasso, a former banker, initially ran for president in 2013, but lost to Correa by more than 30% of the vote in the first round. In both his first and second bids for president, Lasso was aligned with the Creating Opportunities Party (Creando Oportunidades), a conservative-leaning party that formed in 2012 and focused on celebrating the market, eliminating taxes, as well as advocating for an independent judiciary and free speech.

With Correa ineligible for re-election, his supporters formed an organisation Rafael Contigo Siempre (Always with you Rafael) to campaign for a constitutional amendment to allow him to run again. With signatures from 8% of the electorate required to hold a referendum (929,062), a total of 1.2 million were collected. However, Correa stated that he was planning on retiring from politics and would not run again.  Instead, on 2 October 2016 the PAIS Alliance nominated Lenín Moreno, Correa's vice president from 2007 to 2013, as its candidate, with incumbent vice president Jorge Glas as his running mate. Moreno was challenged by Guillermo Lasso, a former banker.

Campaign
A central issue in the presidential election was corruption; scandals in the Petroecuador state oil company and Odebrecht cases led to demands that candidates develop substantive plans to deal with corruption. Moreno proposed an anti-corruption law, while Lasso proposed a Truth Commission, which would be created with assistance from the United Nations.

The two main candidates had very different visions for the country; Moreno's policy ideas were fairly similar to Correa's, while Lasso said he wanted to attack corruption and lower taxes.

Lasso said before the elections that he would not allow Julian Assange to continue living in the Ecuadorian embassy in London.

Electoral system
The President was elected using a modified two-round system, with a candidate required to get over 50% of the vote, or get over 40% of the vote and be 10% ahead of their nearest rival to be elected in the first round. The President is limited to two consecutive four-year terms.

The 137 members of the National Assembly were elected by three methods : 15 were elected from a nationwide constituency, 116 were elected in 31 districts (21 corresponding to the 21 smallest provinces and 10 within the 3 largest provinces, range 2-6 seats per district), and six elected from three two-member constituencies representing Ecuadorians living overseas. Elections are by open list proportional representation (every voter can vote for as many candidates as there are seats to be awarded), with the 15 national seats allocated using the Webster method and the rest using the d'Hondt method. Voting was compulsory except for voters aged 16–18 or over 65 and people classed as illiterate. Members of the National Assembly are limited to two four-year terms, either consecutive or not. There are gender quotas for the party lists, meaning there is alternation between men and women. There are no quotas for minority representation.

Parties have to receive at least 5% of the vote in national elections in order to maintain their legal registration.

Opinion polls

Second round

First round

Results

President
The first-round count was delayed for four days, far longer than usual, raising suspicions from the Lasso camp. In past years, the first-round results were known on election day. Election officials blamed the delays on "numerical inconsistencies" in some ballots. Moreno maintained a consistent lead throughout the count. However, by the fourth day of counting, it was no longer mathematically possible for him to win an outright victory—setting the stage for the runoff.

A recount would have taken weeks and Lenin Moreno (usually referred to as just “Lenin”) challenged all the allegations of fraud. President Correa said that "the moral fraud committed by the right will not go unpunished." Moreno said he will represent those who voted and those who didn't, tweeting "Long live Ecuador! Welcome fighters of peace and of life” along with a picture of him immediately after winning the election. His opponent Lasso, however, encouraged the people to peacefully protest the election results. He tweeted: "Let's act in a peaceful but firm manner, we must go to the streets and say 'don't steal my vote' because we want a change in Ecuador."

The National Electoral Council announced on 13 April that it would recount all ballots contested by both parties, accounting to about 10% of the total vote. Moreno also led the vote after recount of some of the votes, increasing the number of votes obtained by 1,594.

National Assembly
The National Assembly makes up the legislative branch of Ecuadorean government. These elected officials have the power to pass laws, while judges of the national court of justice are chosen by a separate judicial council.

Andean Parliament

References

2017 in Ecuador
Ecuador
Ecuador
Ecuador
Election and referendum articles with incomplete results
Elections in Ecuador